Totutla is a municipality located in the south zone in the State of Veracruz, about 40 km from state capital Xalapa. It has an area of 80.61 km2. The name comes from the language Náhuatl, Toto-tlan; that means “Among the birds".

Geographic Limits

The municipality of  Totutla  is bordered to the north by Tenampa, to the north-east by Tlacotepec de Mejía and to the south-west by Chiapas State.

Agriculture

It produces principally maize, beans, coffee and sugarcane.

Celebrations

In  Totutla , in July takes place the celebration in honor to Santiago Apostol, Patron of the town, and in December takes place the celebration in honor to Virgen de Guadalupe.

Weather

The weather in  Totutla  is cold and wet all year with rains in summer and autumn.

References

External links 

  Municipal Official webpage
  Municipal Official Information

Municipalities of Veracruz